Frank Vizetelly (26 September 1830 – disappeared 5 November 1883) was a British journalist who reported in several parts of the world. He was presumed killed in Sudan during the Battle of Shaykan.

Biography
Frank was the son of James Henry Vizetelly (1790–1838), who founded a firm of Vizetelly & Company known for publishing George Cruikshank's Comic Almanack, and younger brother of James and Henry Vizetelly, both active in journalism and publishing. He was born in London and educated in Boulogne, and went to Paris in 1857.

There, he was an early editor of the French weekly newspaper Le Monde Illustré. From 1859, he was employed as a war correspondent and artist by the Illustrated London News, founded by his older brother, Henry. He traveled to Italy, Spain, and America, where he reported from both sides of the Civil War, and Egypt.

He disappeared, presumed killed, during the massacre of Hicks Pasha's army in Sudan.

References

Further reading
Abraham Lincoln's contemporaries: Frank Vizetelly, Lincoln Financial Foundation Collection, 1961
Bostick, Douglas W. The Confederacy's Secret Weapon: The Civil War Illustrations of Frank Vizetelly. Charleston, SC: History Press, 2009. 
Hoole, William Stanley. Vizetelly Covers the Confederacy. Tuscaloosa, Ala: Confederate Pub. Co, 1957.

External links
Works by Frank Vizetelly in New York Public Library
Drawing the War: Frank Vizetelly, Emerging Civil War

1830 births
1883 deaths 
English war correspondents
British people of the Mahdist War